Eduardo M. Ochoa is an Argentinean-American economist and academic administrator who served as the president of California State University, Monterey Bay 2012 to 2022. Ochoa was the Assistant Secretary of Education for Postsecondary Education during the Obama Administration from 2010 to 2012.

Early life and education 
Ochoa was born and raised in Buenos Aires. His family moved to Portland, Oregon, while he was in high school. He graduated from Reed College with a bachelor's degree in physics. Ochoa earned a Master of Science in nuclear science from Columbia University. He completed a Doctor of Philosophy in economics at The New School.

Career 
Ochoa taught at California State University, Fresno and California State University, Los Angeles as a full professor and chair of the economics and statistics department. He was the acting dean of the School of Business and Economics. In 1997, Ochoa began a six year period as the dean of the Cal Poly Pomona College of Business Administration. He was later the provost and vice president for academic affairs at Sonoma State University for seven years. From 2010 to 2012, he served as the U.S. assistant secretary for postsecondary education in the Obama Administration. In 2012, he became the president of California State University, Monterey Bay.

Personal life 
Ochoa is married and has two sons, Michael Ochoa and Eric Ochoa.

References 

People from Buenos Aires
Living people
Year of birth missing (living people)
Reed College alumni
Columbia School of Engineering and Applied Science alumni
The New School alumni
California State University, Fresno faculty
California State University, Los Angeles faculty
California State Polytechnic University, Pomona faculty
Obama administration personnel
Sonoma State University faculty
California State University, Monterey Bay faculty
Argentine emigrants to the United States
Heads of universities and colleges in the United States
Educators from Portland, Oregon
20th-century  American economists
21st-century  American economists
Scientists from Portland, Oregon